Benson & Farrell is an album co-led by American guitarist George Benson and jazz saxophonist and flutist Joe Farrell; both artists had previously released several albums on the CTI label and had also contributed to the albums Free, CTI Summer Jazz at the Hollywood Bowl, and Giant Box.

Reception
Benson & Farrell gained mixed reviews upon release. The Allmusic review calls the album a "pleasing if not all that memorable instrumental date".

Track listing
All compositions by David Matthews except as indicated
 "Flute Song" - 6:05 
 "Beyond the Ozone" - 7:03 
 "Camel Hump" - 6:25 
 "Rolling Home" - 7:15 
 "Old Devil Moon" (Burton Lane, E.Y. "Yip" Harburg) - 9:23

Personnel
 George Benson – guitar
 Joe Farrell – flute (1, 3, 5), bass flute (1, 3, 5), soprano saxophone (3, 4)

Additional Musicians:
 Don Grolnick – electric piano (1-4)
 Sonny Bravo – acoustic piano (5)
 Eric Gale – guitar (1, 3)
 Steve Khan – guitar (2, 4)
 Will Lee – bass (1-4)
 Gary King – bass (5)
 Andy Newmark – drums (1-4)
 Nicky Marrero – percussion
 Jose Madera – congas (5)
 Michael Collaza – timbales (5)
 Eddie Daniels – alto flute (1, 3, 5)
 David Tofani – alto flute (1, 3)
 David Matthews – arrangements and conductor

Production:
 Creed Taylor – producer 
 Don Hahn – engineer
 Rudy Van Gelder – engineer, mixing, mastering 
 Rene Schumacher – album design 
 Alen MacWeeney – photography

Chart performance

References

CTI Records albums
George Benson albums
Joe Farrell albums
1976 albums
Albums produced by Creed Taylor
Albums arranged by David Matthews (keyboardist)
Albums recorded at Van Gelder Studio